Frédéric "Freddy" A. Mésot (25 May 1905 – October 1979) was a Belgian figure skater who competed in the 1924 Winter Olympics. In 1924 he finished ninth in the singles event.

Results

External links
 

1905 births
1979 deaths
Belgian male single skaters
Olympic figure skaters of Belgium
Figure skaters at the 1924 Winter Olympics
Sportspeople from Sint-Niklaas